Came Home (March 29, 1999 – July 8, 2021) was an American Thoroughbred racehorse. He was sired by Gone West, who was recently pensioned at Mill Ridge Farm. Came Home was out of the graded-stakes-winning mare Nice Assay.

Came Home got his name after a series of failed attempts in the sales ring; thus, he was always coming home. One of these sales attempts included Came Home getting spooked and falling down. According to witnesses, the colt got right back up again as though nothing had happened.

Racing career 
Some of his victories included the Hopeful Stakes (Gr. 1) and the Hollywood Juvenile Championship Stakes (Gr. 3) at the age of two years.

At three, he won the Pacific Classic Stakes (Gr. 1), the Santa Anita Derby (Gr. 1), the Swaps Stakes (Gr. 2), the San Rafael Stakes (Gr. 2), the San Vicente Stakes (Gr. 2), and the Affirmed Handicap (Gr. 3)

At Stud 
Came Home stood the first part of his stud career at Lane's End Farm in Lexington, Kentucky but was shipped to Japan's Shizunai Stallion Station in 2008, where he remained until his death from colic on July 8, 2021.

Notable stock 
c = colt, f = filly, g = gelding

References

External links
 Came Home's pedigree and partial racing stats

1999 racehorse births
2021 racehorse deaths
Racehorses bred in Kentucky
Racehorses trained in the United States
Thoroughbred family 21-a